Marion and Geoff is a BBC television mockumentary in video-diary format, produced by Baby Cow Productions and screened on BBC Two in 2000, with a second series following in 2003. The series starred Rob Brydon as Keith Barret, a naïve taxi driver going through a messy divorce from his wife, Marion, who, though he fails to realise it, has had a long-standing affair with her colleague, Geoff. Each episode is presented as a monologue, filmed by a fixed camera in the confines of his car.

The series were written by Brydon and Hugo Blick, and produced and directed by Blick. The associate producer was Steve Coogan.

The script is written in such a way that the viewer can pick up on clues that Keith has not himself realised.  Numerous references are made to one of his children not resembling him very strongly, an obvious hint that one of the children he loves so dearly is not his own, but in fact Geoff's. Keith also gives clues in the first series about his wife's activities—the viewer knows about Marion's affair long before he works it out himself.

Keith's character is affectionately portrayed as a gentle dunce and draws a great deal of sympathy as the series progresses. He is in denial about his divorce, and somehow always manages to look on the positive side of even the most awful situation. Although he doesn't understand it, his life revolves around Marion and her new partner Geoff, and his love for his "little smashers" (his sons, Rhys and Alun). Despite his faults, Keith is a hard-working and good man.

Series one
Series one consists of ten episodes all around nine minutes long. It was first broadcast in 2000. The series was later repeated, with the original segments combined into 30-minute episodes, though episode 7, "The Monkeys", was not included in this format.

 "The Presents"
 "The Gun"
 "The Homecoming"
 "The Tunnel"
 "The Phone"
 "The Second Hottest Day"
 "The Monkeys"
 "The Birthday"
 "The Divorce"
 "The Girlfriend"

Series two
Series two consists of six episodes all 30 minutes long. It was first broadcast in 2003.

 "The Services"
 "The Boys"
 "The Wife"
 "The Husband"
 "Geoff"
 "Keith"

Other Keith Barret appearances
Comic Relief Special—a 2001 special eight-minute episode for Comic Relief's Red Nose Day, available on the Marion and Geoff Series 1 DVD.
A Small Summer Party—a 2001 50-minute special based around Keith's initial discovery of Marion and Geoff's affair, and thus a prequel to the series proper, although produced between the first and second runs. This was the first time on-screen appearance of Geoff and Marion, played by Steve Coogan and Tracy-Ann Oberman respectively. It is available on the Marion and Geoff Series 2 DVD.
The Keith Barret Show—a 2004 spoof chat/debate show tackling the subject of relationships, hosted by "Keith Barret", who interviewed a different celebrity couple on each show.

Further reading

External links
 Comedy Guide
 

BBC television comedy
British mockumentary television series
2000 British television series debuts
2003 British television series endings
2000s British comedy television series
English-language television shows